Performing Musicians Association of Nigeria (also known as Performing Musicians Employers' Association Of Nigeria and abbreviated as PMAN) is an organisation founded by Christy Essien-Igbokwe and Sunny Okosun in 1984 to guide, protect and promote the interests of musicians in the west African nation of Nigeria. Authorized by the government of Nigeria under the Trade Unions Act, the organisation also has the responsibility to regulate the practice of music profession in the country.

As of 1st of August 2018, the president of PMAN is Pretty Okafor, while the 1st Vice President is Suny Neji, and 2nd Vice Zaaky Azay.

Presidents of PMAN
The following is a list of present and past Presidents of the Performing Musicians Association of Nigeria:

Sonny Okosun
Tony Okoroji
Mustapha Amego
Christy Essien-Igbokwe
Sunny Ade
Charly Boy
Bolaji Rosiji
Tee Mac Omashola Iseli
Pretty Okafor (Current President as of 1st of August 2018)

See also
List of Nigerian musicians
Music of Nigeria

External links
Official site

References

Music organizations based in Nigeria
Organizations established in 1984
1984 establishments in Nigeria